In quantitative genetics, QST is a statistic intended to measure the degree of genetic differentiation among populations with regard to a quantitative trait. It was developed by Ken Spitze in 1993. Its name reflects that QST was intended to be analogous to the fixation index for a single genetic locus (FST). QST is often compared with FST of neutral loci to test if variation in a quantitative trait is a result of divergent selection or genetic drift, an analysis known as QST–FST comparisons.

Calculation of QST

Equations 
QST represents the proportion of variance among subpopulations, and is it’s calculation is synonymous to FST developed by Sewall Wright. However, instead of using genetic differentiation, QST is calculated by finding the variance of a quantitative trait within and among subpopulations, and for the total population. Variance of a quantitative trait among populations (σ2GB) is described as:

And the variance of a quantitative trait within populations (σ2GW) is described as:

Where σ2T is the total genetic variance in all populations. Therefore, QST can be calculated with the following equation:

Assumptions 
Calculation of QST is subject to several assumptions: populations must be in Hardy-Weinberg Equilibrium, observed variation is assumed to be due to additive genetic effects only, selection and linkage disequilibrium are not present, and the subpopulations exist within an island model.

QST-FST comparisons 
QST–FST analyses often involve culturing organisms in consistent environmental conditions, known as common garden experiments, and comparing the phenotypic variance to genetic variance. If QST is found to exceed FST, this is interpreted as evidence of divergent selection, because it indicates more differentiation in the trait than could be produced solely by genetic drift. If QST is less than FST, balancing selection is expected to be present. If the values of QST and FSTare equivalent, the observed trait differentiation could be due to genetic drift.

Suitable comparison of QST and FST is subject to multiple ecological and evolutionary assumptions, and since the development of QST, multiple studies have examined the limitations and constrictions of QST-FST analyses. Leinonen et al. notes FST must be calculated with neutral loci, however over filtering of non-neutral loci can artificially reduce FSTvalues. Cubry et al. found QST is reduced in the presence of dominance, resulting in conservative estimates of divergent selection when QST is high, and inconclusive results of balancing selection when QST is low. Additionally, population structure can significantly impact QST-FST ratios. Stepping stone models, which can generate more evolutionary noise than island models, are more likely to experience type 1 errors. If a subset of populations act as sources, such as during invasion, weighting the genetic contributions of each population can increase detection of adaptation. In order to improve precision of QST analyses, more populations (>20) should be included in analyses.

QST applications in literature 
Multiple studies have incorporated QST to separate effects of natural selection and genetic drift, and QST is often observed to exceed FST, indicating local adaptation. In an ecological restoration study, Bower and Aitken used QST to evaluate suitable populations for seed transfer of whitebark pine. They found high QST values in many populations, suggesting local adaptation for cold-adapted characteristics. During an assessment of the invasive species, Brachypodium sylvaticum, Marchini et al. found divergence between native and invasive populations during initial establishment in the invaded range, but minimal divergence during range expansion. In an examination of the common snapdragon (Antirrhinum majus) along an elevation gradient, QST-FST analyses revealed different adaptation trends between two subspecies (A. m. pseudomajus and A. m. striatum). While both subspecies occur at all elevations, A. m. striatum had high QST values for traits associated with altitude adaptation: plant height, number of branches, and internode length. A. m. pseudomajus had lower QST than FST values for germination time.

See also 

 F-statistics
 Quantitative genetics
 Conservation genetics
 Divergent selection
 Genetic diversity

References 

Genetics terms
Population genetics
Statistical tests